BBC One Northern Ireland is a Northern Irish television channel based on the UK-wide BBC One, owned and operated by BBC Northern Ireland. The service is broadcast from Broadcasting House in Belfast. In the rest of the UK, BBC One Northern Ireland is available as a regional variant on most TV service providers. In the Republic of Ireland, BBC One Northern Ireland is available as a standard channel.

On 24 October 2012, an HD variation of BBC One Northern Ireland was launched, to coincide with the completion of the digital switchover process in Northern Ireland. On 18 November 2013, BBC One Northern Ireland HD was swapped with the SD channel on Sky's EPG for HD subscribers.

The BBC One Northern Ireland branding is utilised from 6am until the handover to the BBC News Channel with live continuity handled by a team of regional announcers who double up as playout directors. The channel's main competitor is UTV while also competing with RTÉ One, RTÉ 2 and Virgin Media One from the Republic of Ireland. Although BBC One NI and UTV are competitors, on the final night of UK digital switchover, BBC One NI and UTV joined forces for a special simulcast, The Magic Box, with Eamonn Holmes, celebrating 60 years of TV history.

History

References

External links 

 
 

1955 establishments in Northern Ireland
BBC television channels in the United Kingdom
English-language television stations in the United Kingdom
Television channels and stations established in 1955
Television in Northern Ireland
Television stations in Ireland
BBC Northern Ireland